The Good Liar is a 2019 crime thriller film directed and produced by Bill Condon and written by Jeffrey Hatcher, based on the 2015 novel of the same name by Nicholas Searle. It stars Ian McKellen as a career con artist who meets a wealthy widow (Helen Mirren) online, and then discovers that his plan to steal her fortune has unexpected roadblocks.

The film premiered at the BFI Southbank in London on October 28, 2019. It was released by Warner Bros. Pictures in the United Kingdom on November 8, 2019, and in the United States on November 15, 2019. It received mixed reviews from critics and grossed $33 million against a budget of $10 million.

Plot
In London in 2009, Roy Courtnay is an ageing British con artist who, along with his business partner Vincent, uses false identities to deceive people into giving him access to their finances. His latest target is Betty McLeish, a former history don at Oxford University who lost her husband a year ago and has savings in excess of £2 million.

Feigning a bad knee, Roy manipulates Betty into allowing him to stay at her house. He steadily encourages her to open a joint offshore investment account with him, so that he can steal her money. Simultaneously, Roy and Vincent run an investment scam with their mark Bryn and his associate by employing fake Russian investors. One of the pretend Russians, actually a Polish butcher, demands a greater cut of the take; in response, Roy orders thugs to break the butcher's hand with a meat tenderizer. Realising he has been robbed, Bryn follows Roy during his date with Betty. Upon spotting Bryn nearby, Roy sends Betty into the shops before luring Bryn into Charing Cross tube station. There, Roy stabs Bryn and then shoves him into the path of an incoming train, killing him. Roy reunites with Betty back at the shops.

Roy and Betty go on holiday to Berlin, where Roy appears to understand German, though he claims he does not. Betty's grandson Steven takes the couple to a flat that Roy recognises. Steven reveals that "Roy Courtnay"— a young British Army officer — was killed there in 1948 by a Nazi war criminal whom he was tracking, according to Soviet records. Roy narrates an elaborate story of his mission in Germany and explains at first that Hans Taub was his German translator. The mission ended in the death of Hans Taub. When Steven refuses to believe his story, Roy is forced to confess that he is Hans Taub, and that he stole Roy's identity so that he could leave Germany and reinvent himself. Betty accepts his explanation and dismisses Steven's objections.

Soon afterwards, Roy and Betty plan to transfer their money into the joint account. Vincent suggests to Roy that he leave at least some of the money for Betty to help with her medical condition, but Roy dismisses the idea and insists that he will leave Betty financially defrauded just like his previous victims. He says he wants enough money to sit on a beach somewhere and sip champagne. Vincent reluctantly complies and later participates in the transactions necessary for the couple to transfer their money into the joint account. However, after leaving Betty and returning to his flat, Roy discovers that he no longer has the keypad needed to access the account. Roy returns to Betty's house to reclaim it, only to find Betty waiting for him and that all the house's contents have been removed.

Betty attempts to force a confession out of Roy, before revealing that her identity and personal history are all fake. Her real name is Lili Schroeder and she has met Roy before, back in 1943 when they were both German teenagers and Hans was tutoring her in English. On their last session, after trying to kiss one of her sisters, Hans raped Lili. After her parents dismissed him, because of the kiss, from continuing his tutoring lessons, Hans denounced Lili's father as a traitor and he was executed by the Nazis. This drove Lili's mother to commit suicide. Later, Lili's sisters were killed in an explosion just two weeks before the death of Adolf Hitler. After the war ended, Lili suffered at the hands of the Russians, learning to be a good liar for survival. Eventually she made her way to England.

After recounting their past, Lili explains to Roy that she has been fully aware of his plan to con her all along. Steven, who was in fact the boyfriend of Lili's real grandson Michael, tracked Roy/Hans' criminal history and they confirmed his identity in a DNA test using a locket from Betty/Lili's childhood that contained a piece of Hans' hair. She also reveals that Vincent has betrayed Roy after being confronted with her knowledge of their crimes.

Betty takes all of Roy's money out of their joint account, leaving him only enough money to pay back the victims of his earlier con. Roy says he will beg her forgiveness, but Betty says she is "beyond him now." Just as she prepares to leave the house, Roy locks the door and attacks her – but she manages to fend him off before he is confronted by Bryn's associate and the Polish butcher whom he previously cheated. Betty then leaves the house as Roy, defiant to the last and refusing to pay his clients back, is consequently beaten up. Weeks later, Roy, having suffered a severe stroke during the fight, is shown in hospital against a painted backdrop of a beach. Vincent pays him a visit. Roy is unable to speak or move. Vincent gives him a drink and says, "Pretend it's champagne" and the liquid dribbles out of Roy's paralysed mouth.

In the final scene, Betty is shown living happily with her extended family.

Cast

Production
In March 2018, it was announced that Bill Condon would direct the film, with Ian McKellen and Helen Mirren cast in the leading roles. In April 2018, Russell Tovey and Jim Carter joined the cast.

Principal production commenced on April 23, 2018, in London, England. The film was also shot in Berlin, Germany.

Release
The film's world premiere was held on October 28, 2019, at the BFI Southbank in London. It was released on November 8, 2019, in the United Kingdom, and on November 15, 2019, in the United States.

Reception

Box office
The Good Liar has grossed $17.2 million in the United States and Canada, and $16.2 million in other territories, for a worldwide total of $33.4 million, against a production budget of $10 million.

In the United States and Canada, the film was released alongside Charlie's Angels and Ford v Ferrari, and was projected to gross around $5 million from 2,439 theaters in its opening weekend. It made $1.6 million on its first day and went on to debut to $5.6 million, finishing seventh at the box office. It fell 40% to $3.6 million in its second weekend, finishing in tenth.

Critical response
The website's critics consensus reads, "The Good Liar is less than the sum of its prestigious parts, but Ian McKellen and Helen Mirren keep the proceedings consistently watchable." On Metacritic, the film has a weighted average score of 55 out of 100 based on 31 critics, indicating "mixed or average reviews". Audiences polled by CinemaScore gave the film an average grade of "B" on an A+ to F scale, while those surveyed at PostTrak gave it 4 out of 5 stars, with 56% saying they would definitely recommend it. The Guardian included it in a list of the most underrated films of 2019.

In his review for The Wall Street Journal Joe Morgenstern wrote, "“The Good Liar” is calculation from arch start to hollow finish... This film grows grim enough to be a companion piece." Ben Kenigsberg of The New York Times commented, "The sleight of hand “The Good Liar” tries to pull off might be easier to keep hidden on the page. As it progresses, the film reveals complications (it plays particularly dubious tricks with the way it parcels out flashbacks to the 1940s) and a motive that might as well have been picked out of a hat. The finale could be written with entirely different details, and almost no scene preceding it would have to change. The real good liar is whoever convinced Mirren and McKellen to class up such thin and arbitrary material." Peter Sobczynski writing for RogerEbert.com gave the movie two and half stars out of four and stated, "...it quickly becomes apparent that this is one of those stories where nothing is quite as it seems, and leading to a shocking revelation that most will see coming, at least in the broad strokes. A film of this sort needs an airtight plot—or at least airtight enough to keep you from questioning things as it is running—but there are a few too many instances in which characters say and do things solely because the plot requires them to do so." Sandra Hall of The Sydney Morning Herald gave the film three and half stars out of five and noted, "...as a result, there's not much suspense. It's an enthralling exercise but a peculiarly cerebral one – a psychological thriller without the thrills." The Guardian'''s Wendy Ide gave the film three stars out of five, stating, "...The Good Liar is at its sparky best when Mirren and McKellen are on screen, waltzing smoothly through a plot that feels like a Russian doll of deeper and deeper deceptions. Flashes of violence are effectively jarring when juxtaposed with the chintzy cosiness of much of the film. Less successful are two thudding, lead-weight flashbacks, which disgorge chunks of exposition and quash some of the fun in McKellen and Mirren's deft double act." Elizabeth Weitzman of TheWrap said, "There’s only one truly unpredictable twist in “The Good Liar,” and that's the disappointment audiences are likely to feel when they leave the theater."The Adelaide Review gave the movie 7/10 points, noting, "Helen and Ian’s first film together (although they’ve previously appeared as a double-act on the stage), this has an especially complex and even unpleasant performance by him, but she’s no slouch too, and it’s good to see Tovey holding his own in scenes alongside these two ‘national treasures’. And yes, as Helen's Betty would say, “It’s so English!”" In his review for Rolling Stone, David Fear gave the film two stars out of five and wrote, "The real question is: Are you willing to endure all of that random swerving for the simple pleasure of these performers’ company? Both actors are, unsurprisingly, bending over backwards here to sell these characters and establish enough screen chemistry to smooth over a lot of rough patches... They play off each other beautifully despite the material, and they get a chance to indulge in the aforementioned range of sound and fury. Yes, you would watch these two in virtually anything. You just wish it wasn't this. They deserve something sturdier and far less head-slappingly preposterous, and that's the truth." Jon Frosch of The Hollywood Reporter added, "An example of the kind of middlebrow, classily accoutered “cinema for adults” that's grown rare in the Age of Marvel, the film may pique the interest of viewers of a certain age; there's a comfy pleasure in watching these two pros patter back and forth in plummy accents, clutching mugs of tea or sipping flutes of champagne. Yet The Good Liar’s sophistication is nothing if not skin-deep. For all its nasty twists and turns, its fake-outs and flashbacks and cheekily preposterous pile-up of double-crosses, this story of an elderly con man and the wealthy widow he targets feels fatally devoid of danger. Square, tame and tidy as the London-area house kept by Mirren’s primly elegant, creamy-complexioned septuagenarian, The Good Liar is a work of skill but little spark." Le News gave the film three stars out of four, stating. "Two superb actors from the grand culture of English drama – Helen Mirren and Ian McKellen – are enough reason to pull you into this intriguing tale of deception... If you’re looking for quality entertainment with an absorbing script, multiple twists and great acting, this is your film. Not a masterpiece, but captivating and satisfying."

David Hughes of Empire gave the film three stars out of five, commenting, "...even if you know what's coming, there's joy in watching two flawless performances from these much-loved veteran actors, relishing every nuance of their characters, and every moment of their time on screen. They're so good, in fact, that the film flags every time one or both of them are off screen, such as during the flashback sequences, with which a more daring adaptation might have dispensed... It may be a shaggy-dog story, with occasional lapses into melodrama, but Mirren and McKellen are on sparkling form, and when a film aimed primarily at pensioners employs both the C-word and gory injury detail, you can't accuse it of being boring." David Ehrlich of IndieWire stated, "...it’s Mirren who’s ultimately asked to carry this movie across the finish line, and she does so with oodles of her signature elan. It’s a rare actor who can split the difference between an airport thriller and a historical reckoning — who’s able to conflate the silly with the serious in a way that completely erases the difference — but Mirren is more than up to the challenge. The final stretches of Condon’s film are so ludicrous that you almost feel swindled for caring about the movie until that point, but Mirren grounds one plot twist after another with the gravity of her conviction (and a little help from Carter Burwell’s lilting, uneasy, “Mr. Holmes”-esque score). “The Good Liar” may not have much to say about redemption, entrapment, or the fibs that can hold a friendship together, but the past is only so important to a wicked little thriller that delights in the moment at hand." Jess Layt of Hawkesbury Gazette gave the movie 5.5/10 points, commenting, "This is a story gives older actors some genuine character work, an actual story and motivations and a life. That being said, the way The Good Liar plays out in its final act feels like a bit of a hoodwink in itself. Audiences have been following these characters for a good chunk of film, only to have odd backstories suddenly revealed for which there is no apparent foreshadowing... The Good Liar'', much like its protagonist, talks big game but is really just confused about its identity and place in the world."

Accolades

References

External links
 
 
 

2010s English-language films
2019 films
2019 crime thriller films
2019 drama films
2019 thriller drama films
American crime thriller films
American rape and revenge films
American thriller drama films
British crime thriller films
British rape and revenge films
British thriller drama films
Bron Studios films
Films about con artists
Films about Nazi Germany
Films about old age
Films based on British novels
Films directed by Bill Condon
Films scored by Carter Burwell
Films set in 1943
Films set in 1948
Films set in 2009
Films set in Berlin
Films set in London
Films shot in Berlin
Films shot in London
Films set on the London Underground
New Line Cinema films
Warner Bros. films
2010s American films
2010s British films